You Will Never Be One of Us is the third studio album by American hardcore punk band Nails, released on June 17, 2016. It is the band's first album issued through Nuclear Blast Records. It is their longest release to date at 21 minutes, and features their longest song, "They Come Crawling Back", which runs for eight minutes. The record was produced by Kurt Ballou of Converge.

Critical reception 

You Will Never Be One of Us received critical acclaim upon its release. At Metacritic, which assigns a normalized rating out of 100 to reviews from mainstream publications, the album received an average score of 87, based on 9 reviews, indicating universal acclaim.

Accolades

Track listing
Track listing adapted from store listing.

Personnel
Nails
Todd Jones – guitars, vocals
John Gianelli – bass guitar
Taylor Young – drums

Production
Kurt Ballou – producer
Wrest – artwork

Charts

References

External links 
 You Will Never Be One of Us at Nuclear Blast

2016 albums
Albums produced by Kurt Ballou
Nuclear Blast albums
Nails (band) albums